The Gas South Arena (originally known as the Gwinnett Civic Center Arena, later known as The Arena at Gwinnett Center and Infinite Energy Arena) is an indoor arena in Duluth, Georgia. The arena is one of the many venues within the "Gas South District", which also includes a convention center with a events hall and a performing arts center. 

It is the home of the ECHL's Atlanta Gladiators and the Georgia Swarm, a professional box lacrosse team in the National Lacrosse League.

Events

Sports
The arena's first event was an arena football game, featuring the Georgia Force – February 16, 2003 The Force played here a total of five seasons, 2003–04, 2008, and 2011–12.
Atlanta Gladiators (2003–present) Known as the Gwinnett Gladiators from 2003 to 2015, before changing to their current name.
The Georgia High School Basketball State Championships – 2004–present
Georgia High School Wrestling State Championships – 2004–present
Georgia Swarm, National Lacrosse League franchise playing since 2016
Professional Bull Riders Challenger Tour Championship (Built Ford Tough Series event) – November 20–22, 2009
2010 SEC women's basketball tournament – March 4–7, 2010
2013 WNBA Finals – October 10, 2013
Kellogg's Tour of Gymnastics Champions – October 29, 2016
Fan Controlled Football Season v1.0 – February 13-March 27, 2021

Professional wrestling
Armageddon (2004) – December 12, 2004
Bound for Glory (2007) – October 14, 2007
Starrcade (2019) – December 1, 2019
AEW Dynamite and AEW Rampage – December 1, 2021
AEW Fyter Fest (2022) Night 2 – July 20, 2022

Mixed martial arts
Bellator 88: Shlemenko vs. Falcão MMA – February 7, 2013
UFC Fight Night: Rockhold vs. Philippou – January 15, 2014

References

External links

Sports in Duluth, Georgia
Atlanta Gladiators
Indoor ice hockey venues in the United States
Basketball venues in Georgia (U.S. state)
Georgia Tech Yellow Jackets basketball venues
Music venues in Georgia (U.S. state)
Sports venues in Atlanta
Sports venues in Georgia (U.S. state)
Buildings and structures in Gwinnett County, Georgia
Gymnastics venues in the United States
Indoor lacrosse venues in the United States
Indoor arenas in Georgia (U.S. state)
Mixed martial arts venues in the United States
2003 establishments in Georgia (U.S. state)
Sports venues completed in 2003
Georgia Swarm